= Lip compression =

Lip compression may refer to:

- Roundedness, lip rounding in vowels
- Labialization, lip rounding in consonants
